Calçado is a city located in the state of Pernambuco, Brazil. Located  at 200 km away from Recife, capital of the state of Pernambuco. Has an estimated (IBGE 2020) population of 11,018 inhabitants.

Geography
 State - Pernambuco
 Region - Agreste Pernambucano
 Boundaries - Lajedo   (N and E);  Canhotinho    (S);  Angelim and Jupi    (W)
 Area - 423.08 km2
 Elevation - 643 m
 Hydrography - Mundaú and Una rivers
 Vegetation - Caatinga Hiperxerófila
 Clima - Hot and humid
 Annual average temperature - 22.1 c
 Distance to Recife - 200 km

Economy
The main economic activities in Calçado are based in agribusiness, especially manioc, beans; and livestock such as cattle, sheep and poultry.

Economic indicators

Economy by Sector
2006

Health indicators

References

Municipalities in Pernambuco